Edward Gallaudet may refer to:

 Edward Miner Gallaudet (1837–1917), first president of Gallaudet University in Washington, D.C.
 Edward Gallaudet (engraver) (1809–1847), American engraver